Natwarlal Pandya, better known by his pen name, Ushnas (Gujarati: ઉશનસ્), was a Gujarati language poet from India.

Biography 
He was born in Savli village near Vadodara on 28 September 1920. He studied in Mehsana, Sidhpur, Savli and Dabhoi. He completed his Bachelor of Arts with Sanskrit in 1942 and Masters in Gujarati in 1945  from Maharaja Sayajirao University of Baroda.
He taught at Rosery Highschool and Garda College in Navsari. He also taught at J P Shroff Arts College in Valsad. He also served as a president of Gujarati Adhyapak Sangh (Gujarati Teachers Union) in 1979. He also served as a president of Gujarati Sahitya Parishad from 1991 to 1993.

He died on 6 November 2011 at Valsad, Gujarat.

Works 
Prasoon was his first collection of poems published in 1955. Other collections include Nepathye (1956), Aardra (1959), Manomudra (1960), Trun No Grah (1964), Spand ane Chhand (1968), Kinkini (1971), Bharat Darshan (1974), Ashwattha (1975), Rupana Lay (1976), Vyakul Vaishnav (1977), Pruthvine Paschim Chahere (1979) and Shishulok (1984). Valavi, Ba Avi and Sadmatano Khancho are his story and poetry compilations. He also wrote plays such as Pantuji, Doshini Vahu and Trun No Grah.

Awards 
He received Kumar Chandrak in 1959,  Narmad Suvarna Chandrak in 1963 and Gujarat Gaurav Award. He also received Ranjitram Suvarna Chandrak, the highest award in Gujarati literature, in 1972. He was awarded Sahitya Akademi Award for his poetry collection Ashwattha in 1976.

The Ushnas Prize is named after him.

See also
 List of Gujarati-language writers

References

External links

Indian male poets
Gujarati-language writers
People from Vadodara district
Recipients of the Sahitya Akademi Award in Gujarati
1920 births
2011 deaths
20th-century Indian poets
Poets from Gujarat
Recipients of the Ranjitram Suvarna Chandrak
20th-century Indian male writers